Prince Alexander Bekovich-Cherkassky, born Devlet-Girei-mırza (died 1717), was a Russian officer of Circassian origin who led the first Russian military expedition into Central Asia.

Background
A Muslim by birth, and the son of one of Kabarda's rulers, Alexander converted to Christianity and joined the Russian service, although the dates and circumstances of these events are not on record. In 1707, he was commissioned by Peter the Great to study navigation in Western Europe, and towards the end of 1711 he was back in Russia. From there, he was sent back to his native Kabarda and persuaded some powerful men there to support the Russian Tsar in his operations against the Ottoman Empire.

Dreaming of Eldorado

Two years later, a Turkmen traveller arrived in Astrakhan and announced to local authorities that the Oxus River, formerly flowing to the Caspian Sea, had been diverted by the Khivans to the Aral Sea in order to extract golden sand from the river waters. Prince Gagarin, who was a local governor at that time, sent his envoys to the Khanate of Khiva in order to verify the fable. They returned with a sack of golden sand, allegedly extracted from the Oxus.

The fable was then given credit, and the Turkmen brought to Saint Petersburg. Tsar Peter, informed about the fabulous wealth of Khiva, was desperately in need of gold to proceed with the Great Northern War. On 14 February 1716 a contingent of 7,000 troops was placed under the command of Prince Bekovich-Cherkassky as a Muslim by birth and an expert in the art of warfare.

Bekovich-Cherkassky was commissioned: 1) to survey the river-bed of the Oxus and to report on the possibility of its diversion to the Caspian; 2) to force the Khivan khan into subservience; 3) to erect a chain of fortifications along the Oxus; 4) to send envoys to India in order to establish direct trade with the Mughal Empire.

Khivan disaster 

Bekovich-Cherkassky received these orders in Astrakhan, where he was engaged in the surveying work, preparing the first map of the Caspian Sea. He was promoted captain and commanded a preliminary expedition in Turkmenistan. He left some of the Cossacks on his way in order to set up the forts in Krasnovodsk and Alexandrovsk.

Back in Astrakhan by February 1717, Bekovich raised another army and started towards Khiva, together with some engineers and land surveyors. It was many months later that several Tatars returned and brought the appalling news of the catastrophe that befell the Khivan expedition. The newly built forts in Turkmenistan were at once evacuated, and that at considerable loss from inclement weather and Turkmen tribesmen.

What exactly happened with Bekovich-Cherkassky remains a matter of some controversy. According to a few surviving members of his contingent, they advanced to within 120 km from Khiva, when the khan attacked them with a 24,000-strong army. After three days of bloody fighting, the Khivans were routed.

Seeing that the enemy was very numerous, Bekovich-Cherkassky understood that diplomacy had a better chance of success. The Russian officer, accompanied only by 500 of his men, rode into the enemy's camp to propose terms. The khan pretended to surrender to him, welcomed him warmly, persuading him to divide the Russian army to dwell in five separate towns in order to facilitate foraging. The Khivans then attacked the five towns one by one, slaughtering most Russians, selling the others as slaves, and executing all Russian officers including Prince Cherkassky.

Peter the Great did nothing to avenge the defeat since he was still occupied by the war with Sweden, and also by the hostility of the Ottoman Empire. It was more than a century later that the Russian Empire resumed its military expeditions into Central Asia.

See also
Khivan campaign of 1839
Khivan campaign of 1873

References

External links

Archive of documents pertaining to the Bekovich-Cherkassky Expedition 

Politicians of the Russian Empire
Russian military leaders
Russian nobility
Explorers of Central Asia
Russian explorers
Converts to Eastern Orthodoxy from Islam
Russian former Muslims
Circassian nobility
Circassian people of Russia
1717 deaths
Year of birth unknown